Darya Yurkevich (born 6 March 1988) is a Belarusian biathlete. She was born in Minsk. She has competed in the Biathlon World Cup, and represented Belarus at the Biathlon World Championships 2016.

References

1988 births
Living people
Belarusian female biathletes
Universiade medalists in biathlon
Universiade bronze medalists for Belarus
Competitors at the 2011 Winter Universiade
Sportspeople from Minsk